Brad's Status is a 2017 American comedy-drama film written and directed by Mike White and starring Ben Stiller, Austin Abrams, Michael Sheen, Jenna Fischer, and Luke Wilson. It premiered on September 9 at the 2017 Toronto International Film Festival in the juried Platform section, and was theatrically released by Amazon Studios and Annapurna Pictures on September 15, 2017.

Plot
Brad Sloan runs his own non-profit organization, and lives a comfortable life with his loving wife and son, but cannot help contemplating how his old friends Craig Fisher, Billy Wearslter, Jason Hatfield, and Nick Pascale are rich and accomplished. Craig works in the White House and published a best-selling book; Jason owns a hedge fund firm; Billy sold a company he founded, moved to Maui, and retired; and Nick is a Hollywood director. Brad's wife, Melanie, tries to comfort Brad, telling him that they do not need to compare themselves with the wealthiest 1%.

In the morning, Brad and his son, Troy, leave for Boston to visit colleges. After Troy confesses to him that he aims to get into Harvard, Brad sees this as a way to make up for his lost ambitions. After arriving at Harvard to meet with admissions, they find out they have missed the appointment by one day. Brad argues to see the admission committee, but Troy gets him to back down. Melanie suggests that Brad should call Craig, which he reluctantly agrees. Brad calls Billy to get Craig's number and finds out that Nick married his boyfriend a few years back, but Brad was not invited. He then laments how his friends' exclusion of him confirms his fears: that he is not only a failure in his own eyes but to others as well. Brad also reflects about his waning sex life with Melanie and how his wife easily gets satisfied, which he thinks might have undermined his ambitions. At a restaurant, Brad opens up to Troy about feeling left out, and Troy picks up on things. After talking to Craig, Craig gets Troy a meeting with the famous Harvard music professor and the dean of admissions.

Brad and his son meet Ananya, a high school musician friend of his son, and her friend Maya. Brad relishes Ananya's idealism and her respect for his work, reminding him of his better days. She also reveals to Brad that she did not like Craig's lectures since she finds him sexist and arrogant. After having dinner with them, Brad and Troy turn down the offer of drinks with them and return to their hotel.

That night, Brad can not sleep so he decides to have a drink with Ananya. He tells her that the non-profit life was a mistake and he should have tried to make money. As he is talking, he recognizes that he's lost her admiration; but he goes on about his perceived mistakes in his career, relative to the success of his friends. Ananya tells him that he is living a privileged life and that there are kids she knows in India who are lucky to have dinner, so he should be grateful for what he has in his life.

Troy meets his role model music composer thanks to Craig pulling some strings. However, when Troy tells Brad that his idol is not as cool as he thought, they get in an argument where Brad tells Troy that he cannot judge people for selling out because he is just living in a bubble. The argument soon ends and Troy attends his interview. During the interview, Jason calls Brad in a rush that Brad does not initially pick up on because of his self-focus. Jason informs him that he is at the Mayo Clinic and that his 3-year old daughter has a tethered spine. Shaken by the news, Brad forgets to ask Troy about how his interview went. Troy tell Brad things went really well. Brad then accompanies Troy to Tufts, his alma mater, where he learns his old professor just died. Watching Troy go on the tour at Tufts, his thoughts are interrupted when Melanie returns his call. Brad expresses his pride about his son and wishes Melanie were there with them.

The next night, Brad has dinner with Craig, to properly thank him for his help. He finds out that his old friends, the ones he believes are leading privileged lives, are actually living with major problems. In addition to Jason Hatfield's daughter having a serious medical condition, he learns Jason's company is under legal investigation. He also learns Billy Wearslter is an addict and alcoholic. Craig also expresses some homophobic remarks about Nick. While Brad tolerates Craig's constant bragging and backhanded compliments, eventually Brad feels conflicted about how Craig treats him, questioning if they really are friends. When Craig seems confused at Brad's reaction, Brad abruptly leaves their dinner. He decides to join Troy at the orchestral performance where Ananya and Maya are playing, explaining to Troy he'd rather be there with him. The beautiful music transports Brad into feeling emotional and reflective, realizing he still loves the things of the world. After returning to the hotel that evening, Troy asks his father if he is having a nervous breakdown. Brad said he just sometimes has doubts that people view him as a failure. Troy explains that everyone only thinks of themselves, so they don't even consider whether Brad is a failure or not.  Troy adds that his opinion is the only one that matters, and he loves his Dad.  Brad is touched and mollified by Troy's words.

In his thoughts, Brad is trying to imagine the future. The movie ends with him repeating, "We're still alive. I am still alive," as he turns over and goes to sleep. At the end of the credits, Brad's imagination wanders back into thinking that his son is busking.

Cast 
 Ben Stiller as Brad Sloan
 Austin Abrams as Troy Sloan
 Devon Packer as young Troy Sloan
 Jenna Fischer as Melanie Sloan
 Michael Sheen as Craig Fisher
 Luke Wilson as Jason Hatfield
 Jemaine Clement as Billy Wearslter
 Mike White as Nick Pascale
 Jimmy Kimmel as himself
 Shazi Raja as Ananya

Production 
On July 13, 2016, it was announced that Plan B Entertainment was developing a comedy film, Brad's Status, written and directed by Mike White, in which Ben Stiller would star. On October 31, 2016, Amazon Studios came aboard to co-finance and distribute the film. Michael Sheen, Luke Wilson, Jenna Fischer, and Austin Abrams joined Stiller in the cast.

Principal photography on the film began in October 2016 in Montreal.

Release
In May 2017, it was announced that Amazon Studios and Annapurna Pictures, who produced another Amazon-released film, Wiener-Dog, would co-distribute the film on September 15, 2017.

Critical response
On review aggregator website Rotten Tomatoes, the film has an approval rating of 79% based on 175 reviews, with an average rating of 6.8/10. The site's critical consensus reads, "Brad's Status transcends its familiar premise with insightful observations and affecting interplay between stars Ben Stiller and Austin Abrams." On Metacritic, another review aggregator, the film has a weighted average score of 71 out of 100, based on 40 critics, indicating "generally favorable reviews".

Accolades

References

External links 
 

2017 films
2017 comedy-drama films
Amazon Studios films
American comedy-drama films
Films directed by Mike White
Films produced by Sidney Kimmel
Films scored by Mark Mothersbaugh
Films with screenplays by Mike White
Films shot in Montreal
Films shot in Boston
Midlife crisis films
Plan B Entertainment films
American independent films
2017 independent films
Sidney Kimmel Entertainment films
Vertigo Films films
Films about father–son relationships
2010s English-language films
2010s American films